Etna is an unincorporated town in Etna-Troy Township, Whitley County, in the U.S. state of Indiana.

History
Etna was platted in 1849. The community was named after Etna, Ohio, the native home of a first settler.

A post office was established at Etna in 1851. The name of the post office was changed to Hecla in 1861, and operated under this name until 1904.

Geography

References

Unincorporated communities in Whitley County, Indiana
Unincorporated communities in Indiana
Fort Wayne, IN Metropolitan Statistical Area